Schausia is a genus of moths of the family Noctuidae erected by Ferdinand Karsch in 1895. It is named in honor of William Schaus.

Species
 Schausia coryndoni Rothschild, 1896
 Schausia dambuza Kiriakoff, 1975
 Schausia gladiatoria Holland, 1893
 Schausia greenwayiae Stoneham, 1963
 Schausia langazana Kiriakoff, 1974
 Schausia leona Schaus & Clemens, 1893
 Schausia mantatisi Kiriakoff, 1975
 Schausia mkabi Kiriakoff, 1974

References

Agaristinae